The 21st running of the women's Flèche wallonne was held on 18 April 2018. The race started and finished in Huy. The route featured seven categorized climbs, including two ascents of the Mur de Huy. The finish line was on the top of the final ascent of the Mur. Anna van der Breggen claimed her fourth Flèche Wallonne victory in a row.

Route
The race started and finished in Huy. The final 30 km loop was covered twice, totaling 118.5 km. 

There were 7 categorized climbs:
45.5 km: Côte de Warre - 2.2 km climb at 4.9%
73 km: Côte d'Ereffe - 2.1 km climb at 5%
83.5 km: Côte de Cherave - 1.3 km climb at 8.1%
89.5 km: Mur de Huy - 1.3 km climb at 9.6%
102 km: Côte d'Ereffe - 2.1 km climb at 5%
112.5 km: Côte de Cherave - 1.3 km climb at 8.1%
118.5 km: Mur de Huy - 1.3 km climb at 9.6%

Teams
Twenty-three teams participated in the race. Each team had a maximum of six riders:

Race summary

The race was run in exceptionally warm and sunny weather, with temperatures exceeding 20°C. On the first ascent of the Côte de Cherave, at 35 km from the finish, Pauline Ferrand-Prévot broke clear, immediately followed by Megan Guarnier, Amanda Spratt and Janneke Ensing. They crested the first ascent of the Mur de Huy in the lead. Spanish rider Mavi García tried to bridge the gap, but was caught again before the Côte de Cherave. The leading quartet's lead rose to 40 seconds at 20 km from the end, but the unrepresented teams led the chase in the peloton and narrowed the gap to ten seconds by the foot of the final Mur de Huy.

South African Ashleigh Moolman was the first to accelerate from the main group, under the one-kilometre banner, and bridged the gap to the four leaders. Guarnier managed to hang on, followed by Anna van der Breggen and Annemiek van Vleuten. Van der Breggen powered ahead in the last 200 m to take her fourth consecutive Flèche victory. Ashleigh Moolman finished second, Megan Guarnier third. It was van der Breggen's third World Tour win of 2018, which moved her into the overall lead of the World Tour classification.

Results

UCI World Tour

Attributed points

Individual ranking after Flèche Wallonne

References

La Fleche Wallonne Feminine
La Flèche Wallonne Feminine
La Fleche Wallonne Feminine
Flèche Wallonne (women's race)